Almodes is a genus of moths in the family Geometridae.

Species
 Almodes carinenta (Cramer, [1777])
 Almodes terraria Guenée, 1857

References
 Almodes at Markku Savela's Lepidoptera and some other life forms

Oenochrominae
Geometridae genera